Lau Sek Ming (born 16 July 1964) is a Hong Kong actor and singing He was born in Hong Kong, but his ancestral home is Chaoyang, Guangdong, China.

Filmography
 Summer of Foam (2010) TV series
 The KungFu Master (2012)
 Zombies Reborn (2012)
 Cold Pupil (2013)
 The Demi-Gods and Semi-Devils (2013)
 Chinese Paladin 5 (TV series)
 The Princess Weiyoung (2016) 
 The Legend of Dragon Pearl (2017)
 Ode to Gallantry (2017) 
 The Thief Rule (2017) 
Princess Silver (2019)
Love of Thousand Years (2020)

References 

1964 births
Living people
New Talent Singing Awards contestants